Amy Orben is a British experimental psychologist who is a group leader at the MRC Cognition and Brain Sciences Unit. Her research considers how digital technologies impact adolescent mental health. Orben was awarded the British Neuroscience Association Researcher Credibility Prize in 2021 and the inaugral Medical Research Council Impact Prize in 2023.

Early life and education 
Orben was an undergraduate student at the University of Cambridge where she studied natural sciences. She moved to the University of Oxford for graduate studies, where she specialised in experimental psychology. During her doctoral research, she was a visiting researcher at the University of Tübingen and Eindhoven University of Technology. After completing her doctorate Orben was made a Cambridge Research Fellow at Emmanuel College.

Research and career 
In 2021, Orben was appointed a programme leader at the MRC Cognition and Brain Sciences Unit. Her research considers novel methodologies to understand how screen time and use of social media impacts psychological well-being in adolescents. Post-millennial mental health (in particular stress, depression and anxiety) is reportedly worse than in previous generations, which is often attributed to social media. Orben showed that this wasn't the entire story: statistically speaking, eating a potato every day had a worse impact on well-being. She argued that social media can be helpful in times of anxiety and loneliness. Orben believes that significant quantities of high quality data about how children engage with technology could be provided by technology giants such as Google and Facebook.

Orben has criticised several of the methodologies currently being used, which largely rely on self-report methods and generate incorrect results. She is also an advocate for open science, and created ReproducibiliTea, an international journal club for researchers to discuss improving science.

Awards and honours 
 2017 We Are The City Techwomen50 Award
 2019 British Psychological Society Award for Outstanding Doctoral Research
 2020 Society for the Improvement of Psychological Science Mission Award for ReproducibiliTea
 2021 British Neuroscience Association Researcher Credibility Prize
 2021 Nominee for the Association for Child and Adolescent Digital Innovation Award
 2023 Medical Research Council Impact Prize

Selected publications

References 

British women psychologists
Living people
Year of birth missing (living people)
Alumni of the University of Cambridge
Alumni of the University of Oxford